Yasir Abbas Naqvi  (born January 25, 1973) is a Canadian politician who has served as the member of Parliament (MP) for Ottawa Centre since the 2021 federal election, sitting as a Liberal. Prior to his election to the House of Commons, Naqvi was active in Ontario provincial politics, serving as the attorney general of Ontario (2016–2018), minister of community safety and correctional services (2014–2016), and minister of labour (2013–2014). He represented Ottawa Centre in the Legislative Assembly.

Background
Naqvi was born and raised in Karachi, Pakistan and immigrated to Canada with his family in 1988 at the age of 15. Naqvi settled in the Niagara Falls, Ontario-area and attended McMaster University and the University of Ottawa Law School. He was called to the Bar in Ontario in 2001 and began practising in international trade law at Lang Michener LLP, eventually becoming a partner. He left Lang Michener in 2007 to join the Centre for Trade Policy and Law at Carleton University. He was President of the Liberal Party of Ontario.

The Ottawa Citizen named Naqvi as one of its "People to Watch in 2010", with a profile in the January 9, 2010 Saturday Observer headlined "Yasir Naqvi, he's a firecracker". Ottawa Life magazine also included him in its Tenth Annual "Top 50 People in the Capital" list for 2010. In a September 2011 column, Adam Radwanski of The Globe and Mail called Naqvi "possibly the hardest-working constituency MPP in the province."

Prior to entering politics he volunteered with a number of community associations including the Centretown Community Health Centre and the Ottawa Food Bank.

Political career

Ontario provincial politics 
Naqvi ran in the 2007 provincial election as the Liberal candidate in the riding of Ottawa Centre. He defeated New Democratic Party (NDP) candidate Will Murray by 2,094 votes. He was re-elected in 2011 and 2014.

He was appointed Parliamentary Assistant to Rick Bartolucci, the Minister of Community Safety and Correctional Services, in the cabinet announcement of 30 October 2007. On 3 October 2008, he was named Parliamentary Assistant to the Minister of Revenue Dwight Duncan. On 24 June 2009 a cabinet shuffle moved John Wilkinson into the role of Minister of Revenue and Naqvi was kept on as his Parliamentary Assistant. On 2 September 2010 Naqvi was appointed Parliamentary Assistant to Minister of Education Leona Dombrowsky.

Naqvi introduced six Private Member's Bills – the "Safer Communities and Neighbourhoods Act", the "City of Ottawa Amendment Act", the "Escaping Domestic Violence Act", the "College and University Student Associations Act", the "Enhancing Red Light Camera System Enforcement Act", and the "Protection of Public Participation Act". Parts of the City of Ottawa Amendment Act were passed as part of the 2010 budget and parts of the Escaping Domestic Violence Act were passed in March 2016 as part of the Sexual Violence and Harassment Action Plan Act. On 17 September 2009, Naqvi introduced a co-sponsored notion with NDP member of Provincial Parliament (MPP) France Gélinas declaring the third week of February "Kindness Week", inspired by a successful Kindness Week initiative underway in Ottawa. Naqvi also co-sponsored Toby's Act with NDP MPP France Gelinas and Progressive Conservative (PC) MPP Christine Elliott which added gender identity and gender expression to the Ontario Human Rights Code.

In March 2013, an article appeared in the Toronto Sun which claimed that Naqvi had endorsed an Islamist book on men physically punishing their wives. The following day in the National Post, Naqvi denied having endorsed the book. The Post reported that "Naqvi acknowledged that he wrote a letter of support for the book two years ago, but says he didn't read it…. The minister says he also didn't authorize the use of his name or comments in the "reviews" section of the book."

In February 2013, when Kathleen Wynne took over as Premier, she appointed Naqvi to her first cabinet as Minister of Labour. After the June 2014 election, Naqvi was moved to the position of Minister of Community Safety and Correctional Services and Government House Leader. In 2016 Naqvi and the Ontario Government were criticized for the state of provincial prisons and the human rights violations of inmates.

On 13 June 2016 he assumed the role of Attorney General following a cabinet shuffle.

Naqvi unsuccessfully sought a fourth mandate in the June 2018 Ontario general election. He came in second behind New Democrat Joel Harden.

Federal politics 
Naqvi was elected for the Liberal Party of Canada in Ottawa-Centre on Sept. 20, 2021, handily winning his seat with 45.5% of the popular vote. He was chosen to serve as Parliamentary Secretary to the President of the King’s Privy Council for Canada and Minister of Emergency Preparedness.

Naqvi resigned from those positions in March 2023 while he was seriously considering running in the next Ontario Liberal Party leadership election.

Electoral record

References

External links

1973 births
21st-century Canadian politicians
Attorneys General of Ontario
Living people
McMaster University alumni
Members of the Executive Council of Ontario
Ontario Liberal Party MPPs
Ontario provincial political party presidents
Pakistani emigrants to Canada
Naturalized citizens of Canada
Politicians from Ottawa
University of Ottawa alumni
University of Ottawa Faculty of Law alumni
Canadian politicians of Pakistani descent